Then Again may refer to:
Then Again (Paul Haig album)
Then Again (John Farnham album)
Then Again..., a compilation album by Colin James
Then Again: A Retrospective, a compilation album by Martha and the Muffins
"Then Again" (song), a single by Alabama